2010 Malta Open is a darts tournament, which took place in Malta in 2010.

Results

References

2010 in darts
2010 in Maltese sport
Darts in Malta
St. Paul's Bay